Premium Times is a Nigerian online newspaper based in Abuja in the Federal Capital Territory. It was launched in 2011. The online medium is notable for investigative journalism and Reports among other fields.

Awards and nominations 
In 2013, Premium Times was nominated for the 'Website/blog of the year' award at the Nigerian Broadcasters Merit Award. In 2017, Premium Times reporters shared in the Pulitzer Prize for participating in the international consortium that investigated the Panama Papers, revealing corruption and offshore tax havens used by highly placed people. In November 2017, Global Investigative Journalism Network announced that Premium Times was awarded Global Shining Light Award for the investigative work on the extrajudicial killings in Nigeria's South-East and How the Onitsha Massacre of Pro-Biafra supporters was coordinated.

See also

 List of Nigerian newspapers

References

Publications established in 2011
Newspapers published in Abuja
2011 establishments in Nigeria
Daily newspapers published in Nigeria
Online newspapers published in Nigeria